"Cowboys to Girls" is a 1968 R&B single written by Kenny Gamble and Leon Huff and performed by The Intruders.  The single was a crossover hit becoming The Intruders' first Top 40 single.  "Cowboys to Girls" was also The Intruders' only #1 song on the R&B singles chart. and a Top 10 smash on the Billboard Hot 100, peaking at #6, making it the biggest hit of The Intruders' career.

Pop culture references

In 1980, Chicano Rock group Tierra interpolated a few lines from the lyrics of "Cowboys to Girls" for their version of The Intruders' Top 10 R&B hit "Together".
 Mos Def incorporated some of the lyrics for the song "Pistola" on his album The Ecstatic.
 The "Duke Of Earl" Gene Chandler, in 1968, did a cover. 
 Canadian music group Sweet Blindness produced a rendition in 1975.
 The song was also featured in the 1995 film Dead Presidents.

Chart positions

References

1968 singles
The Intruders (band) songs
Songs written by Leon Huff
Songs written by Kenny Gamble
1968 songs